Pseudorthodes iole is a species of cutworm or dart moth in the family Noctuidae.

The MONA or Hodges number for Pseudorthodes iole is 10605.1.

References

Further reading

 
 
 

Eriopygini
Articles created by Qbugbot
Moths described in 1894